Caeneressa marcescoides is a moth in the family Erebidae. It is found in Borneo, Papua New Guinea and Thailand.

The wingspan is 19–21 mm. Adults are almost blackish grey, with a complete row of white patches on each side of the abdomen.

References

Moths described in 1988
Syntomini